The 2009–10 C.F. Monterrey season was the 75th season in the football club's history and the 60th consecutive season in the top flight of Mexican football. The club participated in the Apertura and Bicentenario tournaments of the Mexican Primera División as well as in the Copa Libertadores.

Monterrey won the Apertura 2010 tournament.

Coaching staff

Players

Squad information

Transfers

In

Out

Competitions

Overview

Torneo Apertura

League table

Results summary

Result round by round

Matches

Liguilla

Quarterfinals

Semifinals

Final

Torneo Bicentenario

League table

Results summary

Result round by round

Matches

Liguilla

Quarterfinals

Copa Libertadores

Group stage

Statistics

Goals

Clean sheets

Own goals

References

C.F. Monterrey seasons
Mexican football clubs 2009–10 season